Archibald Heggarty (1884 – 1951) was an Irish footballer who played for Stoke.

Career
Heggarty was born in Belfast and played for Lisburn Distillery before joining English side Stoke in 1912. He played 22 times for Stoke in 1912–13, scoring once before returning to Ireland with the Crusaders.

Career statistics

References

Association footballers from Northern Ireland
Stoke City F.C. players
1884 births
1951 deaths
Association football forwards